Prof. Sammu Raghu De Silva Chandrakeerthy (born in 1945) is an academic, researcher and practitioner of the discipline of engineering who has contributed to the development of Engineering Education and research in the field of Civil and Structural Engineering both in Sri Lanka and abroad. He is a former Vice-President of the Society of Structural Engineers, Sri Lanka (1992-1994). He has pioneered in teaching Structural Engineering Design, Building Construction, Construction Engineering, and Building Materials subjects at the University with emphasis to Sri Lankan environmental conditions and local construction practices.

Early life and education

Prof. Sammu Raghu De Silva Chandrakeerthy was born in 1945 and had his schooling at Richmond College, Galle. He entered the Faculty of Engineering of the University of Ceylon at Peradeniya in 1963 and graduated in 1967 with an Honours Degree in Civil Engineering. He obtained the PhD degree specializing in Structural Engineering in 1973, from the University of Sheffield, England.

Career

Prof. S.R. De S. Chandrakeerthy initially worked as a lecturer at the Ceylon College of Technology from 1968 to 1972. After completing of his postgraduate studies at the University of Sheffield, England, he became a lecturer at the University of Sri Lanka, Katubedda Campus in 1973. He was promoted to the grade of Senior Lecturer in 1979 and to the post of Associate Professor in 1985. Prof. S. R. De S. Chandrakeerthy became a Professor of Civil Engineering in 1995. He was the first person from the University of Moratuwa to obtain merit promotions to the grades of Associate Professor and Professor.
Prof. S. R. De S. Chandrakeerthy also functioned as a Senior Designs Engineer (visiting), at T. Harley Haddow and Partners, Edinburgh, U.K. from 1980 to 1981. He was a member of the Editorial Board of the Journal “Engineer” of the Institution of Engineers, Sri Lanka from 1985 to 1987.
Prof. S. R. De S. Chandrakeerthy worked as a British ODA Fellow, Loughborough University of Technology, United Kingdom in 1988, and was a Fulbright Fellow and Adjunct Professor, Drexel University, Philadelphia, USA from 1989 to 1990. In 1992, he worked as an ILO Fellow, Loughborough University of Technology, United Kingdom and acted as a Research Associate, Department of Civil & Geotechnical Engineering, University of Manitoba from 1999 to 2000.
Prof. S. R. De S. Chandrakeerthy was  a structural Design Consultant, Manitoba Hydro, Winnipeg, Canada from 2000 t0 2001 and was a Visiting  Academic, at Monash University, Melbourne and a Visiting Professor at RMIT University, Melbourne in 2009.

Research and publications

He has conducted extensive research on areas of Structural Engineering with special reference to local application issues that have arisen in Sri Lanka.
As professional structural engineering practice relies heavily on extensive use of National standards and Codes of Practice for control of materials, writing specifications and designing and drawing of structures, he has contributed extensively in the development of Sri Lankan Standards and codes of Practice. This has created in creation of knowledge to practicing Structural Engineers, which are of direct relevance in the local context of Sri Lanka.
He has published papers:

 As the sole author in International Journals such as “Journal of Structural Engineering, ACSE”, “Masonry International”, and “ Indian Concrete Journal”
  As an author leading team of student researchers in International Journals such as “ Masonry International “
  As the sole author  of award-winning papers in local peer review publications (Transactions of IESL / E. O. E. Pereira Award  and Engineer Journal / CDE Award)
  As an author leading a team of student researchers in an award-winning paper in local peer reviewed publications (Transactions of IESL / E.O.E. Pereira Award).
He was successful in the publication of 12 papers in International refereed journals, and 51 papers in Sri Lankan refereed publications with many other publications in conferences, workshops, etc.

Awards and Achievements

In 2013, Prof. S. R. De S. Chandrakeerthy was awarded the degree of Doctor of Science (Honoris Causa) by the University of Moratuwa.

References

External links
 Official website of University of Moratuwa

Sinhalese academics
People from Galle
1945 births
Living people
Alumni of the University of Ceylon
Alumni of the University of Sheffield
Sinhalese engineers